Badarah-ye Olya (also Romanized as Bādarah-ye ʿOlyā; also known as Bādarah) is a village in Kuhdasht-e Shomali Rural District, in the Central District of Kuhdasht County, Lorestan Province, Iran. At the 2006 census, its population was 24, in 5 families.

References 

Towns and villages in Kuhdasht County